Philip II (1329 – 25 November 1373) of the Angevin house, was Prince of Achaea and Taranto, and titular Latin Emperor of Constantinople (as Philip III) from 1364 to his death in 1373.

He was the son of Philip I of Taranto and Catherine of Valois. Upon the execution of his cousin Charles, Duke of Durazzo, in 1348, he succeeded as King of Albania. Shortly after, his older brother Louis married their first cousin, Joanna I of Naples, and became king. In April 1355, Philip married Joanna's younger sister, Maria of Calabria.

In 1364, Philip succeeded as titular Latin Emperor of Constantinople and Prince of Achaea and Taranto on the death of his oldest brother, Robert.

Maria died in 1366. On 20 October 1370, Philip married yet another Angevin, Elizabeth of Slavonia, former heir presumptive to the throne of Hungary. He died on 25 November 1373 in Taranto.

All his children had died young. His heir was his sister's son James of Baux.

He had several illegitimate children.

Family
By his first wife, Maria of Calabria, Philip had three short-lived sons: Philip (1356), Charles (1358), Philip (1360). They also had two stillborn children, in 1362 and 1366. By his second wife, Elisabeth of Slavonia, Philip had a son named Philip (1371).

Bibliography

References

Sources

|-

1329 births
1374 deaths
14th-century Latin Emperors of Constantinople
House of Anjou-Taranto
Princes of Achaea
Princes of Taranto
14th-century people from the Principality of Achaea